Teresi is a surname. Notable people with the surname include:

Denny Teresi (born 1954), American radio disc jockey Dennis Terry
Dick Teresi, American writer
Samuel Teresi (born 1960), American politician

See also
Teresa

English-language surnames